East Brunswick Township may refer to the following townships in the United States:

 East Brunswick Township, Middlesex County, New Jersey
 East Brunswick Township, Schuylkill County, Pennsylvania